Ascetostoma is a genus of mostly small deep water sea snails, marine gastropod mollusks in the family Chilodontaidae.

Species
Species within the genus Ascetostoma include:
 Ascetostoma providentiae (Melvill, 1909)
 Ascetostoma pteroton Vilvens, 2017
 Ascetostoma ringens (Schepman, 1908)

References

 Vilvens C. (2017). New species and new records of Chilodontidae (Gastropoda: Vetigastropoda: Seguenzioidea) from the Pacific Ocean. Novapex. 18 (Hors Série 11): 1-67

External links
 Herbert, D. G. (2012). A Revision of the Chilodontidae (Gastropoda: Vetigastropoda: Seguenzioidea) of Southern Africa and the South-Western Indian Ocean. African Invertebrates. 53(2): 381-502

 
Chilodontaidae
Gastropod genera